1,2-Dioxane or o-dioxane is an organic compound with the molecular formula (CH)O, classified as a cyclic peroxide. Its synthesis was reported in 1956 by Criegee and Müller, who prepared it by reacting butane-1,4-diol bis(methanesulfonate) with hydrogen peroxide and distilled it as a colorless liquid. Acids and bases decompose it to gamma-hydroxybutyraldehyde.

Substituted 1,2-dioxanes have also been prepared, and some have been isolated from natural sources.

See also
 1,3-Dioxane
 1,4-Dioxane

References

Dioxanes
Organic peroxides